Bidwell–Sacramento River State Park is a state park of California, United States, preserving riparian habitat on the Sacramento River and its tributary Big Chico Creek.  The park is located on the border of Butte County and Glenn County.  Popular activities include fishing for salmon, steelhead and shad; and floating the river on inner tubes, canoes or kayaks.  The  property was established as a state park in 1979.

The park's riparian habitat is a good quality example of a disappearing natural resource.  The river's various landscapes display great scenic beauty and constant change. The riparian plant and animal communities depend strongly on each other. Massive oaks and cottonwoods give the dense shade needed for the survival of cool-water creatures. Thick understories of elderberry, wild grape, blackberry, wild rose and numerous perennials provide shelter to a diversified wildlife population.

Day use areas
Indian Fishery Day Use Area is an oxbow lake surrounded by oak woodland. This area is conducive to picnicking, bird watching, fishing, and hiking. It is common to observe river otters darting through the water, turtles basking on a fallen tree or herons stalking a meal.

Big Chico Creek Day Use Area is characterized by lush river habitat that opens up to a large gravel bar that fronts the Sacramento River. Here park visitors fish, swim, jet ski, water ski and sun bathe. This is also the location that many river rafts and tubes exit the river.

Pine Creek Day Use Area is a popular location for fishing, canoeing, kayaking, picnicking and bird and wildlife watching.

Irvine Finch River Access is a  parking lot and launch ramp affording park visitors an easy way to access the Sacramento River for boating, canoeing or floating on inner tubes.

See also
 List of California state parks

References

External links

Bidwell–Sacramento River State Park

1979 establishments in California
Parks in Butte County, California
Parks in Glenn County, California
Protected areas established in 1979
Sacramento River
State parks of California